Jefferson Johnson is Director of Choral Activities at the University of Kentucky in Lexington, Kentucky where he conducts the UK Chorale and UK Men's Chorus. He also teaches advanced choral conducting, choral methods and literature, and directs the graduate program (MM and DMA degrees) in choral music. A native of Atlanta, he received the Bachelor of Music degree from the University of Georgia (magna cum laude, 1978), the Master of Music from the University of Tennessee (1981), and the Doctor of Musical Arts degree from the University of Colorado (1992). While living in Atlanta, he was also a member of the Atlanta Symphony Orchestra Chorus and Chamber Chorus conducted by Robert Shaw.

In addition to his work at the University of Kentucky, Dr. Johnson is musical director and conductor of the Lexington Singers, an auditioned community chorus of about 180 singers in Lexington, Kentucky.

References

Year of birth missing (living people)
Living people
University of Georgia alumni
University of Tennessee alumni
University of Colorado alumni
University of Kentucky faculty
American choral conductors
American male conductors (music)
Musicians from Atlanta
Musicians from Lexington, Kentucky
21st-century American conductors (music)
21st-century American male musicians